Demare is a surname. Notable people with the surname include:

Arnaud Démare (born 1991), French cyclist
Jules Demaré, French rower
Lucas Demare (1910–1981), Argentine film director, producer, and screenwriter
Lucio Demare (1906–1974), Argentine composer